The Mevade Botnet, also known as Sefnit or SBC, is a massive botnet. Its operators are unknown and its motives seems to be multi-purpose.

In late 2013 the Tor anonymity network saw a very sudden and significant increase in users, from 800,000 daily to more than 5,000,000. A botnet was suspected and fingers pointed at Mevade. Trend Micro reported that its Smart Protection Network saw a tor module being distributed to Mevade  Trojans.

See also
 Conficker
 Command and control (malware)
 Gameover ZeuS
 Operation Tovar
 Timeline of computer viruses and worms
 Tiny Banker Trojan
 Torpig
 Zeus (malware)
 Zombie (computer science)

References 

Botnets